Korea Plant Service & Engineering or KPS is a South Korean public enterprise established in 1974 to provide electronic power and industrial facilities.

See also

KEPCO
KEPCO E&C

References 

Engineering companies of South Korea